WFFF (1360 AM, "Real Country") is a Mississippi radio station broadcasting a country music format. Licensed to Columbia, Mississippi, United States, the station is currently owned by Haddox Enterprises, Inc. and features programming from Westwood One and USA Radio Network.

References

External links

FFF
Country radio stations in the United States
Radio stations established in 1961
1961 establishments in Mississippi